LGBT is legal within Niger on a technicality; it is not mentioned within the country's criminal statutes because most authorities do not believe the concept exists. The country does not have any anti-discrimination laws and there is no clear "queer community". These citizens experience legal and social challenges not experienced by non-LGBT people, for instance their relationships are not legally acknowledged and they can't adopt. While queer people experience discrimination, according to the U.S. Department of State’s 2010 Human Rights Report there were no known cases of violence against queer people based on sexual orientation or gender identity.

Current life 
There are various LGBT dating websites that cater to the country's citizens, such as Mingle and DivaDate. The site Fridae, which aims to find Niger gay dance parties, pride events, gay accommodation, gay restaurants, gay massage, gay spas and saunas, and other gay-friendly businesses has no events or listings.  The Acclaim Subscriptions service allows gay and lesbian magazines to be delivered to residents of the country.

References

Further reading 
 Sexuality and Gender Roles in Niger

Niger
History of Niger
LGBT in Niger